Gisela Kinzel, née Gottwald (born 17 May 1961 in Kirchhellen) is a retired athlete who represented West Germany.

She specialized in 400 metres, and competed for the clubs VfL Gladbeck and SC Eintracht Hamm.

Competition Results
Her biggest success came in 4 x 400 metres relay at the 1986 European Championships, where she won the silver medal, with the West German national team.

The team consisted of Gisela Kinzel, Ute Thimm, Heidi-Elke Gaugel and Gaby Bußmann.

In addition she helped finish sixth at the 1983 World Championships.

She was fifth at the 1987 World Championships.

She ran in the heats at the 1988 Summer Olympics.

Kinzel won a silver medal for the 400 metre category at the 1987 European Indoor Championships.

Doping
Hans-Jörg Kinzel, Gisela's husband and coach, admitted to administering steroids to his wife.

References

1961 births
Living people
People from Bottrop
Sportspeople from Münster (region)
West German female sprinters
West German female long jumpers
Athletes (track and field) at the 1988 Summer Olympics
Olympic athletes of West Germany
World Athletics Championships athletes for West Germany
SC Eintracht Hamm athletes